Emmanuel Espinosa (born December 5, 1975) is a Mexican Christian musician, singer and songwriter from Hermosillo, Sonora, México. He is the founder and bassist of Christian rock band Rojo, along with his wife Linda (lead vocals).

Biography
One of the most important, influential (exponentially and directly) and biggest contributors to the Christian music in the Latin community, Emmanuel was born and raised in Hermosillo, Sonora, Mexico. His parents were both pastors at a local church where he began to play drums and guitar. He also started working with his older brother, Luis Enrique Espinosa, who is also a renowned Christian singer in the Latin community, and when Emmanuel was 13 years old, he recorded with him.

During his teens, he met Rubén Gonzalez, whom later would be part of his future band. When he was 17, he moved to Mexico City to study music. After studying for six months, he moved to Durango to work in CanZion Productions and travel as Marcos Witt bassist. Meanwhile, he was also working as producer, arranger, composer, and recorded for Witt, Danilo Montero, and Jesús Adrián Romero, among others.

At the end of the 1990s, Espinosa joined Gonzalez and started shaping up his own musical project. After recruiting guitarist Oswaldo Burruel and singer Annette Moreno, they officially formed Rojo in 2000. With the band, Espinosa has enjoyed critical praise and success as the band has been nominated to several awards, including Latin Grammy and Dove Awards.

In 2007, Espinosa published a book called "Enseñame a Vivir" which it translates to "Teach me to Live" in which he shares how to live a life surrendered, of service and devotion to God. 
Espinosa currently leads Pulso Records, a division of CanZion Productions.

Personal life
Espinosa is married to Linda Moreno. They have three children together.

Awards 
 2003, Arpa Award for Songwriter of the Year
 2009, Arpa Award for Producer of the Year

References

External links
Emmanuel Espinosa at BiografiasCristianas

1975 births
Living people
Mexican male singer-songwriters
Mexican singer-songwriters
People from Hermosillo
Musicians from Sonora
Mexican performers of Christian music
21st-century Mexican singers
21st-century Mexican male singers